Fort Ripley was a United States Army outpost on the upper Mississippi River, in mid-central Minnesota from 1848 to 1877. It was situated a few miles from the Indian agencies for the Ho-Chunk and Ojibwe in Iowa Territory and then the Minnesota Territory.  Its presence spurred immigration into the area and the pioneer settlement of Crow Wing developed approximately 6.75 miles (10.86 km) north of the fort.  The post was initially named Fort Marcy.  It then was renamed Fort Gaines and in 1850 was renamed again for distinguished Brigadier General Eleazer Wheelock Ripley of the War of 1812. It was the second major military reservation established in what would become Minnesota.

In 1971 Fort Ripley was listed on the National Register of Historic Places for its state-level significance in the historical archaeology and military history categories. It was nominated for its status as Minnesota's second major military post and for its role in maintaining peace and enabling pioneer settlement in Central Minnesota.

Camp Ripley, a training facility of the Minnesota National Guard, was established in 1929.  It includes the historic site of Fort Ripley and was named in its honor. The nearby city of Fort Ripley, Minnesota, was also named for the old outpost.

Description
Fort Ripley typified remote mid-19th century army posts. The buildings were of timber construction, facing a quadrangle. The fort had a partial stockade with the side facing the river completely open except for two of the three block houses.  It was on a navigable river and an important trade route. The location was geographically remote to Colonial-American population centers, with Native Americans living in the vicinity.

History
Fort Ripley was built in conjunction with the Ho-Chunk had been moved from northeastern Iowa.  Their new reservation near Long Prairie, Minnesota, necessitated a military post nearby to oversee the reservation and administer annuity payments. The government also hoped that the Ho-Chunk, and the fort, would serve as a buffer between the Santee Dakota and the Chippewa, who were warring. Construction began in November 1848. In April 1849, Company A of the 6th Infantry Regiment arrived from Fort Snelling to take up quarters under the command of Captain John Blair Smith Todd. With them were men of Company D 1st Dragoons commanded by 2nd Lt. John W.T. Gardiner.

Commanders and officers:
  General Dana oversaw the 2 years of construction, would become commander of the 1st Minnesota and promoted to brigadier general during the Civil war
Capt. John Blair Smith Todd was the first commander. Became a Brigadier General.  Captain Todd was a first cousin of Mary Todd Lincoln, the wife of Abraham Lincoln.
Major George W. Patten Was commander of the Fort three times as well as at Fort Ridgely.  He lost a hand in combat.
Major Hannibal Day Also was commander of Fort Ridgely and would become a brevet Brigadier General.
Major William S. McCaskey Was a Civil war hero and would become a major general.
Capt. John C. Bates Was a hero of both the Civil and Philippine wars.  He became a lieutenant general.
Lt. Col. J.J. Abercrombie was commander of Fort Ripley twice and was commanding when the Civil War broke out.  He became a Brigadier General.
Lt. Timothy J. Sheehan would be promoted to a brevetted Lt. Colonel by the end of the Civil War.  He was wounded twice at Fort Ridgely and twice at Nashville.   In 1898 he commanded the right flank at the last fight with the Chippewa at Sugar Point where he was wounded 3 times.
Capt. Samuel McLarty post commander sent forward and established Fort Pomme de Terre.  Would be brevetted Lt. Colonel by the end of the Civil War.
 Capt. James L. Fisk Lead his second expedition to the gold fields in Montana Territory from Fort Ripley in 1863.

With occasional exceptions, daily life at Fort Ripley was uneventful. The geographic isolation, summer mosquitoes, and long, cold winters made post life challenging. The Metis oxcart trains traversing the eastern route of the Red River Trails between Selkirk – Fort Garry and the American Fur Trading outpost at Mendota/Fort Snelling(later Saint Paul) passed Fort Ripley. Twice each year, the soldiers trekked to the Long Prairie Agency to supervise government annuity payments of money and goods to the Ho-Chunk/Winnebago and then did the same for the Ojibwe/Chippewa at the Crow Wing Agency.

On July 18, 1850, Congress approved funds to build five military roads in the Minnesota Road Act.  Two originated on Point Douglas at the confluence of the St. Croix and Mississippi Rivers.  The first was named the Fort Ripley Military Wagon Road.  It went north through Cottage Grove, Newport, St. Paul, St. Anthony Falls to Crow Wing seven miles past Fort Ripley.  The distance from St. Paul to Fort Ripley via the wagon road was 150 miles.

In 1853 the Isaac Steven's Railway Survey passed through the Fort Ripley Reservation. It wouldn't be until the 1880s a rail line was constructed through the former fort's lands.  The St. Paul and Pacific Railroad had held the right of way for many years, but it would be the Saint Paul, Minneapolis and Manitoba Railway that laid the track.

In 1855 C Co. 10th Infantry became the garrison, and the Ho-Chunk were forced to move again—to a reservation in Blue Earth County, Minnesota.   Thinking the post was no longer needed, the army withdrew the garrison in 1857. Almost immediately, disturbances broke out between settlers and some Ojibwe, prompting reactivation of the fort by a Company of the 2nd Infantry. With the outbreak of the Civil War the Federal troops were replaced by the 
5th Minnesota.  A troop from the 2nd Minnesota Cavalry was part of the Fort late in the war.  The Fort was garrisoned by A & G Companies 20th Infantry in April 1969.  A Co. was immediately posted forward with G Co remaining until December 1877.

From 1857 to 1861 Companies G, I, L 2nd Artillery Regiment were variously posted to northern forts Snelling, Ridgely, and Ripley.

Typical of 19th-century army posts, Fort Ripley's military reservation was huge. This configuration was chosen because the Ho-Chunk reservation abutted the west bank of the river and caused consternation for those who wanted the unused east side opened to homesteaders. In 1857 the army agreed to auction the eastern lands, but those bidding colluded to underbid. The Secretary of War annulled the sale. In the meantime, many had begun to build and farm the land. The resulting confusion and ensuing litigation took 20 years to resolve.

Military activity on the post intensified during the American Civil War. In January 1861, C and K Companies of the 2nd Infantry were sent south to fight Confederates, and were replaced by companies A and E from the 1st Minnesota who in turn were relieved by A and F Companies of 2nd Minnesota.

Minnesota's War 1862-66

When hostilities broke at Fort Ridgely the commander of Fort Ripley was Captain Francis Hall, Company B 5th Minnesota, who was home on leave. The commanding officer at Fort Ridgely had requested assistance at the upper reservation. 1st Lt. Timothy J. Sheehan and 50 men of C Company had gone to the Upper Sioux Agency leaving a small garrison at Ripley under Lt. Frank B. Fobes.  Sheehan had with him two of Ripley's four 12 pound howitzers.  His troop arrived the first week of August at the Upper Sioux Agency and were quickly dispatched to bring in Inkpaduta.  
They were unsuccessful in locating him and returned to the Agency.  There, after a heated exchange, Sheehan had got the indian agent Galbraith to give out food to nearly 4,000 Sisseton and Whapeton.    Thinking the task was completed the Fort Ripley men departed for their own post.  A messenger caught up with them near Glencoe informing them of an ongoing attack at the Lower Sioux Agency.  They walked all night returning to Fort Ridgely to learn the post commander Capt. Marsh was dead.  1st Lt. Sheehan took command by rank and is credited with leading the Fort's defense. Meanwhile at Fort Ripley indian agent Lucius C. Walker had requested Lt. Forbes to arrest Chief Hole-in-the-Day fearing he would attack, when he had fled.  Upon his return Capt. Hall declared martial law in the region and suggested settlers evacuate to Fort Ridgely.  Three companies of militia joined the fort, one from St. Cloud, Stillwater, and Olmstead County.

Despite an undercurrent of mistrust, relations between settlers and Chippewa was mainly peaceful in northern Minnesota. That nearly changed when the Santee Sioux hostilities broke out. According to the media Chief Hole in the Day of the Gull Lake Band considered the Sioux conflict as an opportunity to gain leverage for redress of grievances by threatened to launch a simultaneous war in northern Minnesota. The rumors caused fearful settlers to  flock to Fort Ripley for security.  Not all of Hole-In-the Day's Gull Lake band were in agreement with him.  Chief Qui-We-Sain-Shish (Bad Boy) went to Fort Ripley on his own.  Company's from both the 6th and 7th Minnesota were rushed to the post.  Word reached the Mille Lacs Band reservation that Chief Hole-in-the-Day was considering attacking the fort.  Head civil Chief Sha-Bosh-Sgun of the Mille Lacs Band of Ojibwe organized his band and lead 700-750 warriors to Fort Ripley to defend the fort and to volunteer to fight the Sioux.    According to the record they presented a sight waving flags and beating drums.  other Chiefs present were Rag-Y-Doss and Quickigishrick.  The Indian Agent met with them and told them to return to the reservation and they would be contacted if their fighters were needed.  He also gave the Mille Lacs a document in appreciation of the Mille Lacs offer stating that they could stay on their reservation for a 1000 years.  War Chief Mou-zoo-mau-nee and 300 warriors remained at Ripley to augment in its defense, 200 from the Mille Lacs band and 100 from their affiliate the Sandy Lake Band.  Shortly after the executions in Makato the Chippewa leaders were summoned to Washington where Lincoln repeated that the Milles Lacs could remain on their reservation for a 1000 years. The State erected a large monument to the Chief and the Mille Lacs band at Fort Ridgely in 1914.  In recognition for their service to the State both bands were designated "non-removable.  On September 2 two Chiefs of the Fond du Lac band were the first to send Lincoln an offer to fight the Sioux.

On September 8, 1862  a Mille Lacs Band Chief with 75-100 warriors was met and stopped at Watab, Minnesota just north of St. Cloud.  They wanted to join the government forces fighting the Sioux.  Fort Ripley was informed and Capt. Hall invited the Chippewa to come to the fort as guests of the State to await a decision on their offer.  Fall-winter of 1862–63 Fort Ripley became the headquarters for the 8th Minnesota.  The regiment had four companies posted there.  In the end of January 1863, Captain Samuel McLarty and D Co 8th Minnesota were ordered from Fort Ripley to garrison at Pomme de Terre and Chippewa Station. After arriving at Pomme de Terre orders came to erect a palisade 9 feet in height creating Fort Pomme de Terre, the largest garrison point between St. Cloud and Fort Abercrombie on the Red River Trail.  The other companies were posted to Manannah, Little Falls, Chippewa Station and Fort Abercrombie.  In 1864 the 8th Minnesota lost more men to the continuing hostilities from the uprising than Sibley's entire expedition lost in the Dakota Territory.

Hole-in-Day's threat was defused thanks to cool-headed negotiating and the garrison's strengthened defenses by the Mille Lacs and Sandy Lake Bands.    For the next three years Fort Ripley was a base for western military campaigns that followed in the Dakota War.  The 8th Minnesota was posted there as were 2 sections of the 3rd Minnesota Light Artillery and troops of the 2nd Minnesota Cavalry Regiment.  In May of 1864 troops of the 1st U.S. Volunteer Infantry Regiment were posted there as well.  Fort activity peaked during the winter of 1863–1864, when 400 cavalry troops and 500 horses were quartered at the fort.

Fort Ripley's COMPANY C, 5th MINNESOTA INFANTRY at the battle of Fort Ridgely: 
First Lieutenant T. J. Sheehan, Commanding
Sergeants, John P. Hicks, F. A. Blackmer (wounded) John C. Ross.
Corporals, M. A. Chamberlain, Z. C. Butler, Wm. Young, Dennis Porter (wounded).
Privates, S. P. Beighley, E. D. Brooks, J. M. Brown, J. L. Bullock, Chas. E Chapel, Zachariah Chute, Sidney Cook, L. H. Decker, Chas. Dills, Chas. H. Dills, Daniel Dills, S. W. Dogan, L. A. Eggleston, Halvor Elefson, Martin Ellingson, C. J. Grandy, Mark M. Greer (killed), J. P Green, A. K. Grout, Andrew Gulbranson, Peter E. Harris (wounded), Philo Henry, James Honan, D. N. Hunt, L. C. Jones, N. I. Lowthian, A. J. Luther (wounded), John Malachy, John McCall, Orlando McFall, F. M. McReynolds, J. H. Mead, J. B. Miller, Dennis Morean, Peter Nisson, Andrew Peterson, J. M. Rice, Chas. A. Rose, B. F. Ross, Edward Roth, C. O. Russell, W. S. Russell, Isaac Shortledge (wounded), Josiah Weakley, G. H. Wiggins, J. M. Ybright, James Young.

In June 1865 the 10th Infantry returned to Fort Snelling and Companies A and I were posted to Fort Ripley.

On April 20, 1869 the 20th Infantry Regiment arrived at Fort Snelling and Companies A and G were the relief sent to Fort Ripley.  In May A Co. was sent to Fort Totten, North Dakota.

On a sub-zero night in January 1877, fire destroyed three buildings. Believing the post had outlived its purpose, the War Department decided to permanently close it rather than rebuild. The troops moved out that summer. The buildings stood abandoned for many years. By 1910, the ruins of the gunpowder magazine, built of stone, were all that remained.

Legacy

On December 16, 1879, the United States House of Representatives passed the bill H.R. 1153 "An Act to Restore to the public domain part of the Military Reservation known as Fort Ripley Reservation" except for the land occupied by the railroad.  Alexander Ramsey, then Secretary of War passed the amendment for the railroad land to the Senate on January 6, 1880, and was entered in the record of the Senate February 4, 1880.

In 1929, the State of Minnesota announced that a new National Guard training site would be built in central Minnesota. The land had to be purchased and, purely by coincidence, the remains of old Fort Ripley were within the proposed boundaries of what the State purchased. The new post—Camp Ripley—took its name from the old.

See also
 National Register of Historic Places listings in Morrison County, Minnesota

References

External links
 

1848 establishments in the United States
1877 disestablishments in Minnesota
Archaeological sites on the National Register of Historic Places in Minnesota
Buildings and structures in Morrison County, Minnesota
Ripley
Military sites of the wars between the United States and Native Americans
National Register of Historic Places in Morrison County, Minnesota
Pre-statehood history of Minnesota
Native American history of Minnesota